Four ships of the Royal Navy have been named Surly:

, a  cutter launched in 1806 and sold in 1837
, a mortar vessel launched in 1855, renamed MV.9 later that year, and broken up in 1863
, an  launched in 1856 and sold in 1869
, a  launched in 1894 and sold in 1920

Royal Navy ship names